Elliot Villar (born June 6, 1980) is an American theater and screen actor. He made his Broadway debut in 2011 as part of the original cast of War Horse. He is perhaps best known for his role as Fernando Vera in the USA Network show Mr. Robot.

Early life and education 
Villar was born on June 6, 1980 in the Bronx, New York. He attended the Villa Maria Academy in the northeastern Bronx for grammar school and received a scholarship to attend the Fieldston School, from which he graduated in 1998. Villar studied drama at Vassar College and received a Bachelor of Arts degree there in 2002. After graduating, Villar was selected for a year-long fellowship with the Shakespeare Theater Company of Washington, D.C. He then returned to New York City for a year before being accepted into the Yale School of Drama. He graduated in 2007 with a Master of Fine Arts in Acting. Villar also trained at the British American Drama Academy and the National Theatre Institute.

Career 
Villar began his professional acting career in 2003 as a fellow of the Shakespeare Theater Company in Washington, D.C. He acted in multiple regional theater productions during this period and made his screen acting debut in the 2004 independent comedy Knots. He then went on to receive an MFA in acting, after which he began a successful New York theater career. In 2007, he starred as Demetrius in the Public Theater's production of A Midsummer Night Dream for their Shakespeare in the Park program. That Fall, he starred in the off-Broadway production The Brothers Size opposite Brian Tyree Henry. In the following three years, he was part off the acclaimed casts of the regional production Boleros for the Disenchanted, the musical Coraline at the Lucille Lortel Theatre, the Shakespeare-adaptation The Age of Iron with the Classic Stage Company, and After the Revolution with Playwrights Horizon. He also had small roles in films and television shows, including The Rebound and Law & Order.

Villar made his Broadway debut in 2011 as part of the cast of the American production of War Horse. As part of the original cast, he played the roles of Allan and Sodat Klausen. The production was critically acclaimed and received five Tony Awards that year. Villar stayed with the production until it closed in January 2013.

In 2013, Villar was in the limited-run production of Collapse at the New York City Center. He also guest acted on episodes of the shows Blue Bloods and Elementary. From 2014 onwards, Villar began acting more for television. He guest starred on many different network TV shows. His first recurring role was in 2015 as Thomas Schmidt in a two-episode arc in FOX's Gotham. In the same year, he had a recurring role in The Affair.

In July 2015, Villar debuted his character Fernando Vera, an eccentric Dominican gangster, in the series premiere of USA's Mr. Robot. He appeared in three episodes in the first season and next appeared in the post-credit scene of the third season's finale episode. Villar was promoted to a main character in the show's fourth and final season.

In the four years following 2015, Villar guest starred on seven television shows and held recurring roles on four other shows; these include AMC's The Son, a seven-episode arc on the science fiction drama Time After Time, as an FBI agent in Sneaky Pete, and as Detective Herrera in the CBS anthology thriller show Tell Me a Story. He returned to the stage in 2018 for the off-Broadway production of Mary Page Marlowe at the Second Stage Theatre.

Personal life 
Villar is married to actress Emily Dorsch.

Filmography

Television

Film

Theater

References

External links 

 Elliot Villar at Internet Broadway Database
 Elliot Villar at Internet Off-Broadway Database
 

1980 births
Living people
American male film actors
American male stage actors
American male television actors
21st-century American male actors
Vassar College alumni
Yale School of Drama alumni